This is a list of notable noodle restaurants, which are restaurants that specialize in noodle dishes.

Noodle restaurants
 Afuri
 Ajisen Ramen
 Bakmi GM, Indonesia
 Boxer Ramen, Portland, Oregon, U.S.
 Hapa PDX, Portland, Oregon
 Ichiran
 Ippudo 
 Ivan Ramen, New York City, U.S.
 Jinya Ramen Bar 
 Kau Kee Restaurant, Hong Kong
 Kinboshi Ramen
 Mak's Noodle, Hong Kong
 Momofuku 
 Momofuku Ando Instant Ramen Museum 
 Mr. Lee 
 Muteppou 
 Noodle Box 
 Noodles & Company
 Ooink, Seattle
 Okryu-gwan 
 Sam Woo Restaurant 
 Shin-Yokohama Raumen Museum 
 Wagamama 
 Wong's King, Oregon, U.S.

See also

 List of noodles
 List of noodle dishes
 Lists of restaurants
 Ramen shop
 Ramen Street 

Lists of restaurants